Majiadian is a town located in the county-level city of Donggang, in Dandong, Liaoning, China.

The economy is based on agriculture and fruit production.

Administrative divisions 
Majiadian administers the following 14 administrative villages:

 Youfang Village
 Shuangshandong Village
 Shuangshanxi Village
 Sanjiazi Village
 Taiping Village
 Liujiadian Village
 Zhushan Village
 Lijiatun Village
 Sandaogang Village
 Daijiagang Village
 Wangjiagang Village
 Majiadian Village
 Xijianshan Village
 Tangjiabao Village

See also
List of township-level divisions of Liaoning

References

Township-level divisions of Liaoning